A mamelon (from French mamelon, "nipple") is a rock formation created by eruption of relatively thick or stiff lava through a narrow vent in the bedrock. Because the lava is not fluid, it does not flow away; instead it congeals around the vent, forming a small hill or mound on the surface.

The term was coined by the French explorer and naturalist Jean Baptiste Bory de Saint-Vincent, to describe the central peak of the Dolomieu Crater in the Piton de la Fournaise volcano on Réunion.

Hanging Rock in Australia is another example of a mamelon.

See also
Breast-shaped hill

Volcanic landforms